Eoin McNamee (1961 in Kilkeel, County Down, Northern Ireland) is a writer of novels and screenplays.

He was awarded the Macauley Fellowship for Irish Literature in 1990. He lives in County Sligo.

Career
He has written two novellas: 
 The Last of Deeds (Dublin, Raven Arts Press, 1989), which was shortlisted for the 1989 Irish Times/Aer Lingus Award for Irish Literature, 
 Love in History (Harmondsworth, Penguin, 1992).

His novels are 
 Resurrection Man (London, Picador, 1994), which detailed the bloodletting of the Ulster Volunteer Force gang, the Shankill Butchers
 Booker-nominated The Blue Tango (London, Faber & Faber, 2001), which examined the murder of Lancelot Curran's 19-year-old daughter, Patricia Curran
 The Ultras (Faber & Faber, 2004), about the killing of Robert Nairac
 12:23, based on the final days of Diana, Princess of Wales (Faber & Faber, June 2007)
 Orchid Blue (Faber & Faber, 2010), which looked at the last hanging in Ireland, in Crumlin Road gaol, of Robert McGladdery for the murder of 19-year-old Pearl Gamble, near Newry, in 1961
 Blue Is the Night (published in 2014), which deals with the involvement of Lancelot Curran in a murder trial in the Northern Ireland of the late 1940s. Blue Is the Night won the 2015 Kerry Group Irish Novel of the Year.

He has also written the Navigator trilogy, for children, The Navigator, City of Time and The Frost Child.

McNamee commenced writing another series for children, the first book of which is The Ring of Five, and the second of which is The Unknown Spy, both of which are based on plotting and espionage.

He has also written a series under the pseudonym John Creed: 
 The Sirius Crossing
 The Day of the Dead 
 Black Cat Black Dog. 
These feature the character of intelligence officer Jack Valentine.

Screenwriting
The film version of Resurrection Man, for which he wrote the script, was released in 1998.

That same year, McNamee also wrote the script for I Want You, a crime film directed by Michael Winterbottom.

He has written for the television series An Bronntanas, Red Rock, Hinterland and the Netflix series Vikings: Valhalla.

References

External links
 

1961 births
Living people
People from Kilkeel
British television writers
British male novelists
British male screenwriters
British male television writers
Male novelists from Northern Ireland
Screenwriters from Northern Ireland
Television writers from Northern Ireland